Lakemont may refer to:

Lakemont, New York, a hamlet in Yates County, New York, United States
Lakemont, Washington, a neighborhood in Bellevue, Washington, United States
Lakemont Park, an amusement park in Altoona, Pennsylvania, United States
Lakemont (grape), a grape cultivar